Ashfield School may refer to:

 Ashfield School, Kirkby-in-Ashfield, a secondary school in Nottinghamshire, England
 Ashfield School, a special-needs school in Liverpool, England
 Ashfield Secondary Modern School a former secondary school in York, England
 Ashfield Boys' High School, a secondary school in Belfast, Northern Ireland

See also
 Ashfield College, Dublin, Ireland